

National flag

Military flags

Historical flags

Political flags

Municipal flags

See also 

 Flag of East Timor
 Coat of arms of East Timor

References 

Lists and galleries of flags
Flags